Sonid may refer to:

Sonid Left Banner, subdivision of Inner Mongolia, China
Sonid Right Banner, subdivision of Inner Mongolia, China